Montgomery Stoffal Lantz (November 24, 1903 – November 2, 1969) was an American football center who played one season with the Pittsburgh Pirates of the National Football League (NFL). He played college football at Grove City College and attended Westinghouse High School in Pittsburgh, Pennsylvania.

References

External links
Just Sports Stats

1903 births
1969 deaths
Players of American football from Pittsburgh
American football centers
Grove City Wolverines football players
Pittsburgh Pirates (football) players